Trachysphaera fructigena is a plant pathogen affecting bananas and cacao trees.

References

Banana diseases
Cacao diseases
Water mould plant pathogens and diseases
Peronosporales
Species described in 1923